The fifth series of the Ojarumaru anime series aired from April 1 to December 6, 2002 on NHK for a total of 90 episodes.

The series' opening theme is "Utahito" (詠人) by Saburō Kitajima. The ending theme is "Acchi Muite Hoi de ojaru" (あっちむいてホイでおじゃる) by Yuriko Fuchizaki, Kazuya Ichijou, Rie Iwatsubo, Omi Minami, Chinami Nishimura, and Yūji Ueda.

The series was released on VHS by Nippon Crown across fifteen volumes, each containing 6 episodes, from October 25, 2002 to August 22, 2003. Nippon Crown later released the series on DVD across two compilation volumes, each containing 10 selected episodes, simultaneously on August 21, 2003. The first volume contains episodes 363, 365, 372, 375, 379, 382, 390, 399, 400, and 402. The second volume contains episodes 406, 409, 413, 422, 423, 435, 446, 447, 449, and 450.

Episodes

References

External links
 Series 5 episode list

Ojarumaru episode lists